Goddess of Love is the sixth album by American soul singer-songwriter Phyllis Hyman. It was released by Arista Records in 1983. 

In 2010, the album was released on compact disc for the first time. Reel Music, an imprint of the Sony Music Entertainment company, oversaw this remastered collection and included a bonus dance re-mix of "Riding the Tiger".

Track listing

Personnel
Phyllis Hyman - vocals
Bill Neale, Bobby Eli, Corrado Rustici - guitar
Bob Babbitt, Randy Jackson - bass guitar
David Sancious, Narada Michael Walden, Thom Bell - keyboards
George Merrill - synthesizer
Charles Collins, Narada Michael Walden - drums
Ed Shea, Larry Washington, Sheila Escovedo - percussion
Fred Berry, Vel Selvan, Wayne Wallace - horns
Carla Vaughn, Debra Henry, Jim Gilstrap, John Lehman, Joseph Jefferson, Kelly Kool, Myrna Matthews, Preston Glass, Thom Bell, David Sancious, Narada Michael Walden, Renaldo Nehemiah, Ronnie Lott, The San Francisco 49er Contingency - backing vocals

References

External links
 

1983 albums
Phyllis Hyman albums
Albums recorded at Sigma Sound Studios
Albums produced by Thom Bell
Albums produced by Narada Michael Walden
Arista Records albums